1,5-Pentanediol is the organic compound with the formula HOCHCHCHCHCHOH.  Like other diols, this viscous colourless liquid is used as plasticizer and also forms polyesters that are used as emulsifying agents and resin intermediates.

1,5-Pentanediol is produced by hydrogenation of glutaric acid and its derivatives.  It can also be prepared by hydrogenolysis of tetrahydrofurfuryl alcohol.

Contamination of Bindeez

A toy called Bindeez (Aqua Dots in North America) was recalled by the distributor in November 2007 because of the unauthorized substitution of 1,5-pentanediol with 1,4-butanediol. The toy consists of small beads that stick to each other upon sprinkling with water. 1,4-Butanediol, which when ingested is metabolized to gamma-hydroxybutyric acid, was detected by GC-MS. ChemNet China lists the price of 1,4-butanediol at between about US$1,350–2,800/tonne, while the price for 1,5-pentanediol is about US$9,700/tonne.

References

Alkanediols